</noinclude>
Ice hockey is a sport played primarily in cold weather countries in the world. The International Ice Hockey Federation has 76 members (54 full members, 21 associate members and 1 affiliate member).

Current countries

Africa

Americas

Asia and Oceania

Europe

Former countries
Former countries played ice hockey through the years.

See also
List of ice hockey leagues
List of members of the International Ice Hockey Federation
List of national ice hockey teams

References

External links
International Ice Hockey Federation